A mechanical soft diet or edentulous diet or soft food(s) diet is a diet that involves only foods that are physically soft, with the goal of reducing or eliminating the need to chew the food.  It is recommended for people who have difficulty chewing food, including people with some types of dysphagia (difficulty swallowing), the loss of many or all teeth, pain from recently adjusted dental braces, or surgery involving the jaw, mouth, or gastrointestinal tract. 

A mechanical soft diet can include many or most foods if they are mashed, puréed, chopped very small, combined with sauce or gravy, or softened in liquid.  

In some situations, there are additional restrictions.  For example, patients who need to avoid acid reflux, such as those recovering from esophageal surgery for achalasia, are also instructed to stay away from foods that can aggravate reflux, which include alcohol, caffeine, chocolate, citrus fruits, ketchup and other tomato products, mint, and spicy foods. Foods such as blackberries and tomatoes may be restricted because they contain small seeds.

Alternatives 
A puréed diet is commonly used for people who have difficulty swallowing and provides a uniformly smooth consistency.  

Soft diets, particularly purée foods, can contribute to the high prevalence of malnutrition in those with dysphagia, especially in long-term care residents. Such diets are often less palatable, and a reduction in food intake is common.  Also, puréed diets are often poorer in calories, protein, and micronutrients than regular diets. 

Most of the foods on this diet can be both puréed and thinned with liquids to be incorporated into a full-liquid diet.

Examples

Desserts 

Cake softened with milk or ice cream
Cheesecake
Cream pies
Custard
Fruit smoothies with crushed ice, milk, soy milk, or yogurt
Gelatin desserts such as Jell-O
Milkshakes and health shakes
Mousse
Soft pies, such as Key lime pie, pumpkin pie, and sweet potato pie
Pudding
Smooth frozen desserts such as frozen yogurt, ice cream, Italian ice, popsicles, and sherbet
Whipped cream or whipped topping

Fruits and vegetables 

Applesauce
Avocados
Bananas, mashed if needed
Creamed corn
Creamed peas
Creamed spinach
Fruit juices
Watermelon
Peeled peaches or pears, very ripe or canned
Soup with soft-cooked vegetables
Vegetable juices such as carrot juice or tomato juice 
Vegetables cooked soft, mashed, or puréed

Grains/starches 

Baked potatoes, skinless, mashed with sour cream or cream cheese
Breakfast cereal (Cheerios, Corn Chex, Corn Pops, Cornflakes, Rice Krispies), softened in milk
Cooked hot cereals such as Cream of Rice, Cream of Wheat, Farina, grits, Maypo, oatmeal, porridge, Weetabix, or Wheatena
Couscous
Lasagne with extra sauce
Macaroni & cheese, cooked soft
Mashed potatoes and gravy
Mashed sweet potatoes
Muffins, pancakes, or waffles, softened with butter or syrup 
Pasta cooked soft
Polenta
Potato salad, mashed
Quinoa
Rice cooked soft, with sauce or gravy
Rice gruel or congee
Risotto

Protein 

Baked beans
Canned chicken or canned tuna
Chicken salad or tuna salad
Chili
Eggs, scrambled
Eggs, beaten and steamed
Cottage cheese
Enchilada pie
Fish cooked soft
Meat in curries, soups, or stews
Ground meat dishes, such as chili con carne, cottage pie ("Shepherd's pie"), hamburgers, meatballs, meatloaf
Nut butter such as almond butter, cashew butter, Nutella, and peanut butter
Refried beans with melted cheese, guacamole, salsa, or sour cream
Ricotta
Sloppy joe
Tofu
Yogurt

See also 
 Liquid diet

References

External links 
NIDCD information on dysphagia
Soft Diets for Gastroenterological Medicine

Diets